Cucumber tree (or cucumbertree) is a common name for several unrelated trees and may refer to:
Averrhoa bilimbi, native to South-east Asia
Dendrosicyos socotranus, native to the island of Socotra.
 Kigelia africana, native to tropical Africa
Magnolia acuminata, native to the eastern United States and southern Canada